Galipea is a genus of plant in family Rutaceae.

Species include:
 Galipea dasysperma
 Galipea granulosa
 Galipea longiflora
 Galipea ossana, DC.
 Galipea panamensis
 Galipea trifoliata

Galipea officinalis is currently a synonym of Angostura trifoliata. Galipea elegans is a synonym of Conchocarpus elegans.

References

 
Zanthoxyloideae genera
Taxonomy articles created by Polbot